Portuguese sweet bread (Portuguese: pão doce "sweet bread" or massa sovada "kneaded dough") is a bread made with milk, sugar, eggs, yeast, flour and sometimes lemon peel to produce a subtly sweet lightly textured loaf or rolls. A slightly different recipe is made during Easter that is known as folar de Páscoa and often contains a hard-boiled egg.  The bread was brought to Hawaii by Portuguese immigrants from Madeira and the Azores. Under the name Hawaiian rolls, Portuguese sweet bread is now considered a quintessential dish in Hawaiian cuisine and is widely consumed throughout the United States.

Portuguese sweet bread is traditionally made in Madeira and the Azores around Christmas, and the Easter version is made around Easter, but it is also available year-round on the islands. It is uncommon to find this type of bread in mainland Portugal. It is traditionally baked in a stone oven known as a forno.

The bread is usually served simply with butter and is sometimes served with a rice pudding known as arroz doce.

Portuguese sweet bread is common in areas with large populations of Portuguese Americans and Portuguese Canadians, such as New England, Hawaii, northern New Jersey, southern Florida, California, and Ontario, Canada especially Toronto, and it is prominent in Hawaiian and New England cuisines. At one time, Hawaii featured numerous fornos for baking Portuguese breads constructed by Portuguese immigrants. 

Like most baked goods, Portuguese sweet bread in its traditional form goes stale very quickly.  In Hawaii, it was frequently called "stone bread" because of its habit of turning hard as a rock within one day of baking.  Robert Taira's King's Hawaiian was the first bakery to turn "Hawaiian bread" into a mass-produced shelf-stable consumer product, after Taira cleverly tweaked the recipe to extend its shelf life while maintaining flavor and texture.

See also 
 Folar, the Easter version of Portuguese sweet bread
 Fougasse
 Pan dulce

References

 

Sweet breads
Hawaiian desserts
New England cuisine
Portuguese cuisine
Easter bread
Christmas food